Danthonia unispicata is a species of grass known by the common name onespike oatgrass, or onespike danthonia.

It is sometimes treated as a variety of Danthonia californica, to which it is similar. It is native to western North America, where it grows in several types of habitat, including grassland and open areas in mountain forests.

It is a perennial bunchgrass growing in clumps 10 to 30 centimeters tall, with very hairy, rolled leaves. The inflorescence bears a single spikelet, or sometimes up to four spikelets.

References

External links
Calflora Database: Danthonia unispicata (One spiked oatgrass)
Jepson Manual eFlora (TJM2) treatment
USDA Plants Profile
Grass Manual Treatment
Forest Service Fire Ecology
Photo gallery

unispicata
Bunchgrasses of North America
Native grasses of California
Grasses of the United States
Grasses of Canada
Flora of the Western United States
Flora of Western Canada
Flora of the Great Basin
Flora of the Klamath Mountains
Flora of the Sierra Nevada (United States)